The Sierra de Guadalupe is a mountain range in Mexico. It is found between the borough of Gustavo A. Madero in northern Mexico City and the municipalities of Cuautitlán Izcalli, Tultitlán, Coacalco, Ecatepec and Tlalnepantla, in the State of Mexico.

History 

There is evidence that the Aztecs worshipped Tonantzin (Goddess of Sustenance) at Tepeyac hill. The sierra is named after Our Lady of Guadalupe, a Marian apparition that, according to oral and written colonial sources such as the Huei tlamahuiçoltica, Juan Diego saw at the Tepeyac hill.

In 1937, the El Tepeyac National Park was created in the Tepeyac hill, in the eastern portion of the sierra, by decree of the president Lázaro Cárdenas.

Geology
The sierra is a dormant volcano that is part of the Trans-Mexican Volcanic Belt. The basement is made of andesitic and dacitic soil. The last volcanic activity in the area occurred 14 to 15 million years ago.

Ecology

Climate
The sierra has a humid subtropical climate. It rains mostly during summers with rainfall of between 700 and 800 mm (2.5 and 3.5 in) per year. The temperature ranges from 12 to 16 °C (53 to 60 °F).

Fauna
Among the species found in the sierra, it is included the Mexican pine snake, the American kestrel, the roadrunner, the opossum, and the bobcat. Introduced species include the white-tailed deer, tapirs and bisons.

Flora
In the area, quercus trees and xerophile plants are abundant.

Preservation
The area has suffered from environmental deterioration due to deforestation. Part of the eastern part of the sierra was reforested with the introduction of eucalyptus, pinus, cedrus and casuarina trees.

It is composed of the following hills:
 Cerro del Sombrero or Pico Tres Padres
 Cerro de los Gachupines
 Cerro del Chiquihuite
 Cerro del Picacho Moctezuma
 Cerro del Picacho El Fraile
 Cerro del Picacho El Jaral
 Cerro del Tenayo
 Cerro Petlecatl
 Cerro de la Calavera
 Cerro Gordo
 Cerro Zacatenco
 Cerro del Guerrero
 Cerro de Santa Isabel
 Cerro del Tepeyac

Gallery

References

External links

Coacalco de Berriozábal
Cuautitlán Izcalli
Ecatepec de Morelos
Gustavo A. Madero, Mexico City
Landforms of Mexico City
Landforms of the State of Mexico
Mountain ranges of Mexico
Tlalnepantla de Baz
Trans-Mexican Volcanic Belt
Tultitlán